The Ford Model T Depot Hack is a depot hack made by Ford from 1919 to 1923. It was based on the chassis of the Ford Model TT.

History
The Depot Hack was made to hold luggage and passengers and was used as a minibus-like vehicle or taxi. It was specifically built to hold a high capacity of people and their luggage, the depot hack was not on Ford's catalogue but was made by independent firms who used as a passenger vehicle. It had 20 horsepower, 176 cubic inches, a four-cylinder engine, and its transmission was 2-speed planetary.

References 

Model TT